Alfred Pennington (1875 – after 1899) was an English professional footballer who played as a full-back.

References

1875 births
Sportspeople from Burslem
English footballers
Association football fullbacks
Bristol Rovers F.C. players
Grimsby Town F.C. players
Folkestone F.C. players
Shrewsbury Town F.C. players
English Football League players
Year of death missing